David John Artell (born 22 November 1980) is a professional football manager and former player who most recently was manager of  club Crewe Alexandra.

He began his career as a centre back with Rotherham United, as the "Millers" won successive promotions from the Third Division to the First Division in 1999–2000 and 2000–01. He joined Shrewsbury Town on loan for the 2002–03 season, before successive two-year spells with Mansfield Town and Chester City, then joining Morecambe in July 2007. He joined Crewe Alexandra in June 2010, and captained the "Railwaymen" to victory in the 2012 League Two play-off final. He joined Port Vale in July 2012, but switched to Northampton Town the following month. After a loan spell at Wrexham in February 2013, he joined the club on a permanent basis seven months later. He signed with Bala Town in summer 2014, and then Port Talbot Town in February 2016, and then Kidsgrove Athletic and Droylsden in 2016. He also won seven caps for the Gibraltar national team in 2014 and 2015.

He was appointed manager of Crewe Alexandra in January 2017 and went on to lead the club to promotion out of League Two at the end of the 2019–20 season, and became League Two Manager of the Year as a result. In 2020–21, Crewe finished 12th in League One – the club's highest finish since 2005–06 - but the following season was one of the worst in Crewe's modern history; the club was relegated back to League Two with four games still to play, and on 11 April 2022 Crewe parted company with Artell.

Club career

Rotherham United
Artell began his career with hometown club Rotherham United, making his debut as a substitute in a 2–0 defeat by Swansea City at Vetch Field on 12 October 1999 – this was his only appearance as the "Millers" won promotion as runners-up in the Third Division. He scored his first senior goal on 23 September 2000, in a 1–1 draw with Stoke City at the Britannia Stadium. Artell went on to make 40 appearances in 2000–01, as the club claimed second place in the Second Division to win a second successive promotion. He never featured at Millmoor in the First Division under manager Ronnie Moore.

Artell spent September onwards of the 2002–03 season on loan at Kevin Ratcliffe's Shrewsbury Town. He helped the "Shrews" to knock Premier League giants Everton out of the FA Cup, but could not prevent the club from suffering relegation out of the Football League after finishing in last place. He later said that the dressing room was divided between younger and older players. Upon his return from the Gay Meadow, he discovered that he was to be released by Rotherham in May 2003.

Mansfield Town
Artell joined Third Division side Mansfield Town on a short-term contract at the start of the 2003–04 season. He made 32 appearances over the course of the campaign, and was an unused substitute in the play-off final defeat to Huddersfield Town at the Millennium Stadium. He played 23 games of the 2004–05 season, but had surgery and was then frozen out of the first team picture after manager Keith Curle was replaced by Carlton Palmer in November.

Chester City
Artell followed Curle out of Field Mill and onto Chester City in July 2005; the move was surrounded by accusations of an 'illegal approach' by the "Seals". He featured 41 times in 2005–06, retaining his first team spot at the Deva Stadium under new boss Mark Wright. Artell went on to post 50 appearances during the 2006–07 campaign. However, he was released by new manager Bobby Williamson in May 2007, after a period of time unsuccessfully negotiating a new contract.

Morecambe
In July 2007, he signed with Football League newcomers Morecambe. In only his second competitive game for the club, he achieved hero status by scoring a late winner in a shock League Cup 2–1 success over Preston North End at Deepdale. He went on to form a strong defensive partnership with Jim Bentley, making a total of 44 appearances in 2007–08. After losing his first team place, manager Sammy McIlroy told Artell he could leave the club on loan in November 2008. He instead chose to stay, and managed to win back his first team spot to play 43 games in 2008–09. He then scored eight goals in 42 games in 2009–10, to help the "Shrimps" to win a place in the League Two play-offs with a fourth-place finish. In the play-off semi-final second leg against Dagenham & Redbridge he scored the final goal ever at Christie Park, in what was a 2–1 win; however Morecambe lost the tie 7–2 on aggregate.

Crewe Alexandra
In June 2010, Artell signed a two-year contract with Crewe Alexandra after joining on a free transfer. He said that the chance to work closely with manager Dario Gradi excited him, and that Gradi's status as a renowned coach convinced him to join the club. Artell was immediately appointed as co-captain, alongside Lee Bell and Ashley Westwood. In March 2011, he had a minor bust-up with Gradi after he was substituted during a home win over Chesterfield.

He missed two months of the start of the 2011–12 season with a hamstring injury. In December 2011, new manager Steve Davis reinstalled him as the club's captain. However the next month he was sent off for a "dangerous tackle" on Barnet's Izale McLeod. In February, he had an on-the-pitch row with goalkeeper Steve Phillips; Phillips was booked for the row – it was the second time in the campaign that the goalkeeper had on-the-pitch row with a teammate. Artell was nominated for the League Two Player of the Month award in March 2012, but lost out to Torquay United's Lee Mansell. Artell captained the "Railwaymen" to victory over Cheltenham Town in the play-off final at Wembley. Despite this he was released from the club just five days later.

Port Vale to Northampton Town
Artell joined Port Vale on a one-year deal, with the option for a second, on 6 July 2012. Upon signing with the League Two club he stated that "...geography had a big part to play in my decision. Promotion possibilities, money, length of contract, they all come into it and Port Vale ticked all those boxes." However, he departed the club on 11 August, days before the start of the 2012–13 campaign. He had refused to sign a revised contract as the club failed to exit administration as expected. Two days later he signed a two-year deal with Northampton Town; manager Aidy Boothroyd said that "he's the coagulant that will connect the other bits and pieces." He got off to the perfect start to his "Cobblers" career, scoring the equalizing goal in a 2–1 League Cup win over Championship side Cardiff City. However, he picked up an Achilles injury in October, which required three months of rest to heal. Upon his recovery he found himself out of the first team picture at Northampton.

Wrexham
On 26 February 2013, Artell joined Wrexham of the Conference Premier on loan for the remainder of the 2012–13 season. He was sent off on the last day of the season in a 1–0 defeat to Mansfield Town at Field Mill, and was expected to miss the play-offs with suspension, before a Football Association of Wales disciplinary panel lifted his three-match suspension. He went on to score in the semi-final first leg 2–1 victory over Kidderminster Harriers at the Racecourse Ground. Wrexham reached the play-off final at Wembley, but were beaten 2–0 by Newport County. Northampton also lost the League Two play-off final to Bradford City, though Artell did not feature in the match.

Artell signed a 12-month contract with Wrexham in September 2013. Artell made his debut as a permanent Wrexham player in a 2–0 win against Luton Town on 13 September. His first league goal for the "Dragons" came in a 5–2 win over Hyde at Ewen Fields on 28 December. He made a total of 30 appearances in the 2013–14 campaign, helping the club to a 17th-place finish, six points above the relegation zone. He was released at the end of the campaign.

Later career
In summer 2014 he signed for Welsh Premier League club Bala Town. The "Lakesiders" finished second in the 2014–15 campaign, 18 points behind The New Saints. In January 2016, Artell left Bala for fellow Welsh Premier League side Port Talbot Town. The "Steelmen" were relegated at the end of the 2015–16 season after being rejected a licence by the Football Association of Wales Club Licensing Appeals Body; this was despite the club finishing one place and 12 points above the relegation zone. He signed with Northern Premier League club Kidsgrove Athletic in June 2016, and scored two goals in cup competitions for the "Grove". He moved onto Northern Premier League First Division side Droylsden in November 2016.

International career
Artell was called up to the Gibraltar national football team in February 2014. He made his debut on 1 March 2014 in Gibraltar's second official match, a 4–1 friendly defeat to the Faroe Islands at the Victoria Stadium.

Style of play
The Football League Paper described Artell as "an archetypal lower-league stopper", and former manager Jim Bentley said that "he was committed, he was aggressive, he was brave".

Managerial career
In July 2014 he became Academy operations manager at former club Crewe Alexandra whilst still playing for Bala Town.

Crewe Alexandra

On 8 January 2017, Artell was appointed as Crewe Alexandra's first team manager, replacing Steve Davis. One of his first moves was to appoint another ex-Crewe player and former Bala teammate Kenny Lunt as assistant manager. With his side facing the possibility of relegation out of EFL League Two after a 4–0 defeat at Hartlepool United on 28 February, Artell warned his players that "relegation means oblivion... they'll end up in the Conference North on £200 a week with a job as a milkman." Crewe promptly won four of their next five games in March to move towards mid-table safety, a team performance that helped earn Artell a nomination for EFL League Two Manager of the Month. The "Railwaymen" ended the 2016–17 campaign in 17th place, and Artell released six players in the summer. He warned the remaining out-of-contract players to sign their new contracts quickly before he withdrew their offers, but said "we all had a say. It's not a dictatorship. I'm not Idi Amin or Pol Pot... it's evolution, not revolution, but we won't be happy with 17th in the table again next season".

Under Artell, Crewe fared marginally better in the 2017–18 season, finishing in 15th position thanks to a strong finish to the season. Crewe had been 22nd in November; Artell saying "We have to get out ourselves of the mire. It's win some games, or oblivion". Two months later he criticised his team's game management skills after they lost two games in a row from winning positions – including throwing away a 3–1 lead over Swindon Town to lose 4–3. On 20 February, Crewe lost 2–1 at home to Exeter City despite taking the lead on 88 minutes; Artell again criticised his player's professionalism and said: "That sums us up. Played well, better team, in the lead, snatched defeat from the jaws of victory. That's been us over the course of the season". Crewe's form improved following Exeter though, as ten points from a possible 18 took them over the 40-point mark by 20 March. On 5 May 2018, Artell selected a starting 11 who were all Crewe Academy graduates against Cheltenham Town and was picked as EFL manager of the week after his team won 2–1.

Despite opening the season with a 6–0 thumping of Morecambe that earned Artell the opening EFL manager of the week award, Crewe struggled in the first half of the 2018–19 season. Artell was then nominated for the EFL League Two Manager of the Month award after they climbed the table with ten points from five games, including a 1–0 win at promotion-chasing Milton Keynes Dons. Artell admitted he had to come up with better 'coping mechanisms' after receiving four yellow cards and one sending off during the season. Reflecting on his team's progress, he said that it was a 'critical statistic' that his side failed to beat any of the bottom 11 sides away from home. Hoping to improve on a 12th place finish, Artell released four players, while centre-back George Ray rejected the club's contract offer.

Promotion
After starting the 2019–20 season with four wins in six games, Artell was again nominated for the EFL League Two Manager of the Month award. Crewe were top of the table on 15 March when the EFL was suspended due to the COVID-19 pandemic in England. Artell said he was "100% confident" that the season would not be scrapped, stating that "The integrity of each competition is important and we have to play the games that are left, whenever that is". He was proved wrong. Clubs voted to end the campaign without playing the remaining fixtures, and although Crewe were promoted Swindon Town won the league title with a higher points per game. Nonetheless, Artell was selected as League Two Manager of the Year in the League Managers Association Awards, the first Crewe manager to win such an annual award.

In 2020–21, Crewe Alexandra underwent a difficult period off the pitch following publication of the Sheldon report into a sexual abuse scandal relating to multiple offender and former youth-team coach Barry Bennell. Artell kept the club performing well on the pitch, signing five new players on free transfers – Offrande Zanzala, Mikael Mandron, Donervon Daniels, Omar Beckles and Luke Murphy – and cashing in on Perry Ng and Harry Pickering. Crewe went on to finish 12th in League One at the end of the season – the club's highest finish since relegation from the Championship in 2005–06.

Relegation
During the summer of 2021, midfielders Charlie Kirk and Ryan Wintle left; Owen Dale was keen to move and eventually went on loan, and Tom Lowery became involved in a protracted contract dispute. Artell attempted to strengthen the Crewe squad, but two experienced signings (Tommie Hoban and Shaun MacDonald) quickly retired, and Artell had to sign several less experienced players on free transfers and loan deals. Crewe won just one of their first 15 league games and were bottom of the table on 2 November, six points from safety after a draw against fellow strugglers Doncaster Rovers. After Crewe were knocked out of the FA Cup in the first round by Swindon Town, Artell brought in former team-mate Alex Neil as a "fresh pair of eyes" to review Crewe's first team. However, Crewe continued to struggle, losing seven consecutive games in early 2022 before Artell's 100th victory as manager, a 2–1 win at Cheltenham Town, briefly raised his hopes of an unlikely escape from relegation. Further defeats followed, however, and in March Artell reshuffled his management team, appointing Alex Morris as assistant manager, with Lunt becoming player development manager. In "one of the worst" seasons in Crewe's modern history, the club was relegated with four games still to play after a 2–0 defeat at Doncaster on 9 April 2022. Two days later, Crewe replaced Artell with Alex Morris.

Artell subsequently said he was "unquestionably proud" to be "the only person who has achieved promotion as both a player and manager at Crewe," though it ultimately proved exhausting. Reflecting on his managerial spell at Crewe, Artell said:
"I was doing coaching, recruitment, scouting, loan strategies, transfer strategies, individual development and contract negotiations. Everything you can think of, really, on top of being the manager. I was doing all I could do to look after everyone. My assistant, my coaches, the analyst, the academy manager, the head of coaching, all the way down to the head of the pre-academy; even the tea lady! ... I loved having all that responsibility, and I learned so much from being able to do so much. But, in truth, by the end, I was out of puff."

Managerial style
Artell has been fined and given touchline bans by the Football Association for his "expressive and passionate touchline behaviour".

Personal life
In summer 2010, he graduated from the University of Chester with a degree in forensic biology, with the intention of going on to achieve a master's degree. He had previously studied a forensic and analytical science degree course at Sheffield Hallam University.

Career statistics

Club career statistics

International career statistics

Managerial statistics

Honours

Playing
Rotherham United
Football League Second Division second-place promotion: 2000–01

Crewe Alexandra
Football League Two play-offs: 2012

Managerial
Crewe Alexandra
League Two second-place promotion: 2019–20
League Two Manager of the Year, 2019–20

References

1980 births
Living people
Footballers from Rotherham
English footballers
English people of Gibraltarian descent
Gibraltarian footballers
Gibraltar international footballers
Association football defenders
Rotherham United F.C. players
Shrewsbury Town F.C. players
Mansfield Town F.C. players
Chester City F.C. players
Morecambe F.C. players
Crewe Alexandra F.C. players
Port Vale F.C. players
Northampton Town F.C. players
Wrexham A.F.C. players
Bala Town F.C. players
Port Talbot Town F.C. players
Kidsgrove Athletic F.C. players
Droylsden F.C. players
English Football League players
National League (English football) players
Cymru Premier players
Northern Premier League players
English football managers
Gibraltarian football managers
Crewe Alexandra F.C. managers
English Football League managers
Crewe Alexandra F.C. non-playing staff
Alumni of Sheffield Hallam University
Alumni of the University of Chester